Gris is a video game.

Gris may also refer to:

People 
 Gris Davies-Scourfield, (1918–2006), British Army officer and Colditz escapee
 Gris Grimly, the pen name of Steven Soenksen (born 1975), American artist and storyteller 
 Le Gris, 18th-century chief of the Pepikokia band of the Miami tribe
 Jacques Le Gris (–1386), French squire and knight
 Jean Antoine Arthur Gris (1829–1872), French botanist 
 Juan Gris (1887–1927), Spanish painter

Other uses 
 Gamma-Ray Imaging Spectrometer
"Gris", a song by J Balvin from Colores, 2020

See also

 GRI (disambiguation)
 Gris gris (disambiguation)